The Citizen and Republican Movement (French: Mouvement républicain et citoyen) is a political party in France. The party replaced in 2002 the Citizens' Movement (Mouvement des citoyens, MDC) founded by Jean-Pierre Chevènement, who left the Socialist Party (PS) in 1993 due to his opposition to the Gulf War and to the Maastricht Treaty. It is a Eurosceptic party with leftist aspirations.

Chevènement led the list l'autre politique (the Other Policy) for 1994 European Parliament election. It included members of left-wing opposition (socialist and communist candidates) to Maastricht Treaty, feminists, radicals, and Gaullists. The MDC supported the Socialist candidate Lionel Jospin for the 1995 French presidential election, then integrated the Gauche plurielle coalition. From 1997 to 2000, it was represented in the government by Chevènement as Interior Minister. In order to prepare the 2002 French presidential election, Chevènement created the Pôle républicain, which included a wide range of politicians including radicals, Gaullists, souverainists, and socialists. He won over 5% and is sometimes blamed for Jospin's elimination. Its lack of success in the 2002 French legislative election, losing all 7 MDC deputies elected in 1997, prompted Chevènement to rename his party the Citizen and Republican Movement. Chevènement was defeated in his seat in Territoire-de-Belfort.

The foundation of the MRC meant a realignment to the left, and the Pôle républicain was supposed to gather "the Republicans of the left and the right". Chevènement and the MRC supported the Socialist Ségolène Royal's candidacy in the 2007 French presidential election to prevent a new 21 April 2002 shock. The MRC fielded candidates in the 2007 French legislative election, including Chevènement in Territoire-de-Belfort, seat he had lost in 2002 to the Union for a Popular Movement (UMP). He failed to win back his seat, but Christian Hutin, a left-wing Gaullist, was elected in the Nord département. The party has one Senator, Chevènement, who sits in the European Democratic and Social Rally (RDSE) group, which is the more pro-European group. In the 2009 and the 2014 European Parliament elections, the party did not run or support any list. Negotiations with the Socialist Party and the new Left Front failed.

In October 2018, PS MEP Emmanuel Maurel and senator Marie-Noëlle Lienemann announced that they would leave the Socialists to ally with the MRC in a new party called Gauche républicaine et socialiste (GRS). On 12 November 2018, a group presided over by Jean-Marie Alexandre announced the reconstitution of the MDC as a party.

References

External links
Official web site

1993 establishments in France
Democratic socialist parties in Europe
Eurosceptic parties in France
Gaullist parties
Left-wing nationalist parties
Left-wing populism in France
Nationalist parties in France
Political parties established in 1993
Socialist parties in France